Sarah Dorothy Keith-Lucas (born 12 February 1982) is an English meteorologist, and a BBC weather presenter on BBC One.

Early life
Keith-Lucas was born in Hastings, East Sussex in 1982. She is the daughter of Christopher Leslie Keith-Lucas (born 1949) and Claire Forrester. Her middle name comes from her grandmother Dorothy de Bauduy Robertson, who was killed in a road accident in 1979; Dorothy's husband was David Keith-Lucas, who was an aerodynamicist in Kent during World War II, and President, from 1968–69, of the Royal Aeronautical Society. Sarah has an older brother.

For part of her education Keith-Lucas attended Cranbrook School, Kent, a co-educational state grammar school. She took her GCSEs at Robertsbridge Community College.

She studied Geography at Durham University (Collingwood College).

Personal 
Keith-Lucas is married to Richard Sutton and they have two children.

Career
Keith-Lucas joined the Met Office in 2007 and started presenting forecasts for BBC Weather in 2008. She has done the five-day weather forecast on the BBC One series Countryfile. She also presents occasional weather-based documentaries on the BBC News and BBC World News channels Climate Check and Weather World, which she co-presents with Nick Miller.

Miscellaneous
Keith-Lucas won an episode of Celebrity Mastermind that aired on 4 March 2023; her specialist subject was the 1986 film Labyrinth.

References

External links
 BBC Weather

1982 births
Alumni of Collingwood College, Durham
BBC weather forecasters
People educated at Cranbrook School, Kent
People from Hastings
Living people